Liao Guoxun (February 1963 – 27 April 2022) was a Chinese politician who served as mayor and deputy party chief of Tianjin. He was of Tujia ethnicity. 

Born in Chengdu, Sichuan, he graduated from Guizhou Normal University and Central Party School of the Chinese Communist Party. He began his career as a teacher in Kaili, before getting into politics in the government of Qiandongnan Miao and Dong Autonomous Prefecture. He was deputy party chief of Tongren in 2007 and one year later was promoted to party chief position. Afterwards, he was member of the CCP Standing Committees in two provincial-level administrative divisions of both Guizhou and Zhejiang and one direct-administered municipality Shanghai.

He was a delegate to the 11th and 13th National People's Congress. He was a delegate to the 18th National Congress of the Chinese Communist Party and was a delegate to the 19th National Congress of the Chinese Communist Party.

Early life and education
Liao was born in Chengdu, Sichuan, in February 1963. After the resumption of National College Entrance Examination, he was accepted to Guizhou Normal University, where he majored in chemistry.

Political career

In Guizhou 
After graduating in August 1983, he was dispatched to Kaili No. 4 High School as a teacher and deputy secretary of the Communist Youth League Committee. Liao became involved in politics in January 1986, when he was transferred to the Organization Department of CPC Qiandongnan Prefecture Committee. By June 2007 when he was appointed deputy party chief and later party chief of Tongren, he had served in various posts in the General Office of CCP Guizhou Provincial Committee. In April 2012, he was elected a member of the Standing Committee of CCP Guizhou Provincial Committee at the First session of the 11th CCP Guizhou Provincial Committee, a position at vice-ministerial level.

HR chief of Zhejiang 
In April 2015, he was transferred to east China's Zhejiang province and appointed head of the Organization Department of CPC Zhejiang Provincial Committee and a Provincial Standing Committee member.

Supervisory chief of Shanghai 
A year and a half later, he was transferred to the neighboring direct-administered municipality Shanghai and appointed a member of the Standing Committee of CPC Shanghai Municipal Committee and secretary of the CPC Shanghai Municipal Commission for Discipline Inspection, the party's agency in charge of anti-corruption efforts. On January 28, 2018, he was unanimously elected as director of the newly founded Shanghai Municipal Supervisory Commission, the government's agency in charge of anti-corruption efforts. On February 28, 2020, he was promoted to become deputy party chief of Shanghai, a position he held until the end of August 2020.

Mayor of Tianjin 
On August 31, 2020, he was appointed deputy party chief of North China's Tianjin municipality. He was named acting mayor on September 3 and was installed as mayor on September 16. His last public appearance was on April 24, 2022, when he attended and spoke at the Tianjin municipal work conference on deepening pollution prevention and control.

Death
On April 27, 2022, Liao died of a sudden illness at the age of 59. His death was announced on the public account of newspaper Tianjin Daily in WeChat on the following evening, with the obituary being very brief.

References 

1963 births
2022 deaths
People from Chengdu
Tujia people
Guizhou Normal University alumni
Central Party School of the Chinese Communist Party alumni
People's Republic of China politicians from Sichuan
Chinese Communist Party politicians from Sichuan
Mayors of Tianjin
Delegates to the 11th National People's Congress
Delegates to the 13th National People's Congress